Clovis Guy Adiaba Bondoa (born 2 January 1987) is a Cameroonian football defender who plays for ŠK FC Vydrany.

International 
Adiaba was captain of Cameroon at the 2007 African Youth Championship.

References

External links
 
 
 

1987 births
Living people
Footballers from Douala
Cameroonian footballers
Olympic footballers of Cameroon
Footballers at the 2008 Summer Olympics
Association football defenders
Steel Azin F.C. players
FC DAC 1904 Dunajská Streda players
AC Sparta Prague players
Slovak Super Liga players
Czech First League players
Expatriate footballers in Iran
Expatriate footballers in Slovakia
Expatriate footballers in the Czech Republic
Cameroonian expatriate sportspeople in Iran
Cameroonian expatriate sportspeople in Slovakia
Cameroonian expatriate sportspeople in the Czech Republic
Cameroon under-20 international footballers